Jefferson Hall may refer to:

Jefferson Hall, a building at the University of Virginia, in Charlottesville, Virginia

or it may refer to:
Other places
Jefferson Hall (Union Point, Georgia), listed on the National Register of Historic Places (NRHP) in Greene County
Jefferson Hall (Detroit), a demolished apartment building in Detroit that is NRHP-listed

Person
Jefferson Hall (actor), British actor

See also
Jefferson House (disambiguation)

Architectural disambiguation pages